Longkamp is an Ortsgemeinde – a municipality belonging to a Verbandsgemeinde, a kind of collective municipality – in the Bernkastel-Wittlich district in Rhineland-Palatinate, Germany.

Geography 
Longkamp is surrounded with meadows and forests. It lies at the edge of the Hunsrück south of the Moselle and is a state-recognised tourism community. It belongs to the Verbandsgemeinde of Bernkastel-Kues, whose seat is in the like-named town.

History 
In 1030, Longkamp had its first documentary mention. The name is of Gallo-Romance origin and derives from the Latin longus campus, which means “long field”. Until 1802, Longkamp was united with Kommen into one municipality.

Politics

Municipal council 
The council is made up of 16 council members, who were elected by proportional representation at the municipal election held on 7 June 2009, and the honorary mayor as chairman.

The municipal election held on 7 June 2009 yielded the following results:

Mayors 
Since 2019, Horst Gorges has been Mayor of Longkamp. His predecessor was Franz-Josef Klingels, in office between 2007 and 2019. He succeeded Hans Johann Herrmann (CDU).

Economy and infrastructure

Economy 
Although there were still 150 farming businesses in the 1950s, agriculture today only plays a very small rôle in the local economy.

Education 
In Longkamp are one kindergarten and one primary school.

Transport 
Frankfurt-Hahn Airport lies 21 km away.

Further reading 
 Leo Kolz: Longkamp – Historischer Rückblick.  
 Franz Schmitt: Chronik von Longkamp.
 Inge Brucker: "Platt geschwätzt un goud gääß" Stories and recipes in Plattdeutsch from Longkamp and Kommen

References

External links 

  

Bernkastel-Wittlich